Kazakhstan Medical Students' Association (Qazaqstan medıtsına jastarynyń organızatsııasy), founded in 2014, is a medical student organization with members from nine medical educational institutions across the country.
KazMSA, is a full member of the International Federation of Medical Students' Associations.
There are nine medical educational institutions in Kazakhstan:
 Astana Medical University;
 Karaganda State Medical University;
 Kazakh National Medical University, named after SD Asfendiyarov;
 State Medical University of Semey;
 West Kazakhstan State Medical University, named after M. Ospanov;
 South Kazakhstan Medical Academy;
 Kazakhstan-Russian Medical University;
 Ahmet Yesevi University.

Organization 
All activities of the IFMSA are linked to one of its six standing committees, which are:
 Standing Committee on Medical Education (SCOME)
 Standing Committee on Professional Exchange (SCOPE)
 Standing Committee on Research Exchange (SCORE)
 Standing Committee on Public Health (SCOPH)
 Standing Committee on Sexual & Reproductive Health including HIV/AIDS (SCORA)
 Standing Committee on Human Rights and Peace (SCORP)

Principles 
 The Association pursues its aims without political, religious, social, racial, national, sexual, or any other discrimination
 The Association promotes humanitarian ideals among medical students and so seeks to contribute to the creation of responsible future physicians. 
 The Association presents the interests of medical students and promotes the effective implementation of future opportunities in today's medical environment by providing cultural, environmental, recreational, amateur athletic, scientific and educational activities.

Objectives 
 Consolidate and coordinate medical students in Kazakhstan – Association members – to promote the social prestige of the medical profession, medical and pharmaceutical workers in Kazakhstan.
 Participation in shaping the young generation of experts in all fields of medicine. 
 Implementation of collaboration with students and young doctors from other states and associations. 
 Promoting medical students and young doctors in gaining practical experience and theoretical medical knowledge worldwide. 
 Assist in the creation of modern Kazakhstan on effective national health system and medical education. 
 Creation and implementation of current legislation established scientific and educational and training programs and projects for young people. 
 Collaboration with universities, research institutions of Kazakhstan and foreign countries. 
 Development of ideas of humanity and medical ethics. 
 Development of ideas of healthy lifestyles among young people.

Presidents 
 2020-2021 Gapsamet Abdulvakhabov
 2021-2022 Aygerim Akhmetzhan
 2022-2023 Dana Amanzhol

Education in Kazakhstan
Education in Astana
Medical and health organizations based in Kazakhstan